Coleophora darica is a moth of the family Coleophoridae.

References

darica
Moths described in 1994